Humberto Barrera (born December 31, 1941) is an American boxer. He competed in the men's flyweight event at the 1960 Summer Olympics.

References

1941 births
Living people
Flyweight boxers
American male boxers
Olympic boxers of the United States
Boxers at the 1960 Summer Olympics
Boxers from Texas
Sportspeople from Corpus Christi, Texas